The Olympic Hymn, also known as the Olympic Anthem, is a choral cantata by opera composer Spyridon Samaras (1861–1917), with lyrics by Greek poet Kostis Palamas. Both poet and composer were the choice of the Greek Demetrius Vikelas, who was the first President of the International Olympic Committee.

History
The anthem was performed for the first time for the ceremony of opening of the first edition at the 1896 Summer Olympics in Athens, Greece. In the following years, every hosting nation commissioned to various musicians the composition of a specific Olympic hymn for their own edition of the games.

The anthem by Samaras and Palamas was declared the official Olympic Anthem by the International Olympic Committee in 1958 at the 54th Session of the IOC in Tokyo, Japan. The anthem was performed in English at the 1960 Winter Olympics in Squaw Valley and since then it has been played at each Olympic Games: during the opening ceremony when the Olympic flag is hoisted, and during the closing ceremony when the Olympic flag is lowered.

Lyrics

English version 
If the anthem is to be performed in English, then the English sung version is used, which has been usually in English-speaking countries. If it is to be performed in a language other than English or Greek, then the original version is translated to the language it is to be performed but in the 2008 and 2022 Beijing Games, Greek was also sung instead of Chinese and in the 2016 Rio de Janeiro Games, English was sung instead of Portuguese. At the 2020 Tokyo Games, English was sung instead of Japanese. The only Games in which lyrics of the English version were used in translation were the 2010 Winter Olympics in Vancouver, Canada. Donovan Seidle, associate music director during the games, arranged the anthem, translating some of the stanzas to French in recognition of the official bilingualism in Canada.

List of performances at the Olympics
The anthem has been recorded and performed in many different languages, usually as a result of the hosting of either form of the Games in various countries. The IOC doesn't require that the anthem be performed in either English or Greek, but in the 2008 & 2022 Olympic opening and closing ceremonies, in Beijing, China, Greek was sung instead of the host country's official language, Mandarin. Also in the 2016 Olympic opening and closing ceremonies in Rio de Janeiro, Brazil, English was sung instead of host country's official language, Portuguese, and in the 2020 Olympic opening and closing ceremonies in Tokyo, Japan, English was also sung instead of Japanese.

See also
 Olympic symbols

Notes

References

External links 
 The original score of the Olympic Hymn, transcribed at Wikisource
 Philip Barker. The Anthem – Olympism's Oldest Symbol
 English lyrics
 A collection of recordings of the Olympic Hymn in various languages

Anthems of organizations
Compositions by Spyridon Samaras
1896 compositions
Anthems
Hymn
Cantatas
Anthem
Olympic theme songs
Compositions in B-flat major
Compositions in F major
Kostis Palamas